The Tjeldsund Bridge is a suspension road bridge that crosses the Tjeldsundet strait between the mainland and the island of Hinnøya in Troms og Finnmark county, Norway. The bridge has 32 spans.

The bridge carries the European route E10 highway, connecting the municipalities of Harstad and Tjeldsund. It is part of a network of bridges that connect the islands of Vesterålen and Lofoten to the mainland.

Gallery

References

External links

Picture of Tjeldsund Bridge
Updated weather information for bridges & mountain crossings northern Norway

Bridges completed in 1967
Road bridges in Troms og Finnmark
1967 establishments in Norway
Suspension bridges in Norway
European route E10 in Norway
Harstad
Tjeldsund
Roads within the Arctic Circle